Jersey Girl is a 2004 American comedy-drama film written, co-edited and directed by Kevin Smith. It stars Ben Affleck and Liv Tyler with George Carlin (in his final onscreen film appearance before his death), Stephen Root, Mike Starr, Raquel Castro, Jason Biggs and Jennifer Lopez in supporting roles. The film follows a widowed man who must take care of his precocious daughter after her mother dies during childbirth.

It was the first film written and directed by Smith not to be set in the View Askewniverse as well as the first not to feature appearances by Jay and Silent Bob, although animated versions of them appear in the View Askew logo at the beginning of the film and the still version at the end. At $35 million, not including marketing costs, it was then Smith's biggest-budgeted film, and was a box office bomb, grossing just $36 million.

Plot
Powerful New York City media publicist Ollie Trinké's wife, Gertrude, dies during childbirth due to an aneurysm. To avoid his grief, he buries himself in his work and ignores his new daughter, Gertie, while his father, Bart, whose own wife died many years earlier, takes a month off from work to take care of her, later returning to work to convince his son to live up to his responsibility as a single parent. Stressed by a crying baby, he insults his client, Will Smith, in front of assembled reporters. He is fired and moves back in with Bart in New Jersey. He eventually apologizes for ignoring Gertie and attributes his public outburst to his grief.

Blacklisted by all of New York City's public relations firms, Ollie has to work as a civil servant in the borough where he now lives. Seven years later, Gertie, now in elementary school, often coaxes him to rent films to watch. At the video store, they meet Maya, a graduate student and one of the clerks, whose uninhibited probing into Ollie's love life almost leads to them having sex. She soon enters their lives.

As part of his job in the borough, Ollie speaks to a group of outraged citizens to win over their approval for a major public works project that will temporarily close a street in the neighborhood. His successful and enjoyable interaction with them makes him realize how much he misses public relations work. He contacts Arthur, his one-time protégé, who sets up a promising interview.

The prospect of moving back to New York City creates tension among Ollie, Gertie, Bart, and Maya, especially when he says that his interview is on the same day as Gertie's school talent show. She angrily yells at him for putting himself before her again, going as far as to say that she hates him and that she wishes he had died instead of her mother. He claims he hates her too, and says she and her mother took his life away and he just wants it back, which shocks everyone. Gertie tearfully runs to her room and a disappointed Bart quietly chastises Ollie for what he said. A few days later, they reconcile, apologizing for their hurtful words, and she accepts that they will be moving to New York City. While waiting to be interviewed, he has a chance encounter with Will Smith. Smith is unaware who Ollie is, but their  conversation about work and children persuades Ollie to skip the interview and leave.

Ollie rushes to make it to Gertie's Sweeney Todd performance at the last moment. The film ends with him, Gertie, Bart, Maya, and the rest celebrating at the bar. He and Maya hint at possible feelings for each other before Gertie interrupts them. He holds her in his arms and says that they are staying in New Jersey because he decided to not take the job. She asks why he did so if he loved it so much. He then says that he thought he did, but he loves his new life more because being a father to her was the only thing that he was ever really good at.

Cast

Production
The film's budget included $10 million for Affleck and $4 million for Lopez. In the original draft of the script, Bruce Willis rather than Will Smith was the cause of (and eventual resolution to) Ollie's problems. Smith wrote the first fifty pages of the script with Bill Murray and Joey Lauren Adams in mind. The film was primarily shot in Highlands, New Jersey. Academy Award-winning Vilmos Zsigmond, its director of photography, was said by Smith to have been "an ornery old cuss who made the crew miserable." Paulsboro, New Jersey served as another of the shooting locations; scenes were shot there at its municipal building, Clam Digger Bar, and high school. Cut from it were scenes at Paulsboro's St. John's Church and Little League Field. The scene in the church was to show the marriage between Ollie and Gertie; it was cut shortly after Affleck and Lopez split up in real life and their scenes were reshot, reducing her part due to concern over the poor box-office reception of Gigli.

It is the first major theatrical release to include a joke about the September 11 attacks: when Gertie asks to see Cats, Ollie refuses on the grounds that it is "the second-worst thing to happen to New York City." On the second episode of the podcast "Blow Hard with Malcolm Ingram", Smith tells a story of Malcolm sending him lyrics to "Landslide" by Fleetwood Mac, trying to apologize for an earlier incident. He was so touched by the email that he included the song in the soundtrack.

Jason Mewes, who plays Jay in the View Askewniverse films, was to have a part in the film as "Delivery Guy", but Kevin Smith had temporarily severed ties with him as part of a "tough love" approach to get him to quit using heroin. The role was given to Matthew Maher.

Soundtrack
 "Everyone's A Kid At Christmas" – Performed by Stevie Wonder
 "Let's Stay Together" – Performed by Al Green
 "Parents Just Don't Understand" – Performed by Jeffrey A. Townes (as DJ Jazzy Jeff) and Will Smith (as the Fresh Prince)
 "That's How I Knew This Story Would Break My Heart" – Written and Performed by Aimee Mann
 "Swing Low Sweet Chariot" – Performed by George Jones
 "Worlds They Rise and Fall" – Performed by The Incredible String Band
 "Johanna" – Written by Stephen Sondheim
 "Wandering" – Performed by Ben Folds
 "Landslide" – Performed by Fleetwood Mac
 "My City of Ruins" – Written and Performed by Bruce Springsteen
 "High" – Performed by The Cure
 "Let My Love Open The Door (E.Cola Mix)" – Written and Performed by Pete Townshend
 "Jersey Girl" – Performed by Bruce Springsteen
 "God That's Good" – Performed by Ben Affleck, Liv Tyler, Raquel Castro, Stephen Root, and Mike Starr

Release 
The film is Smith's first to have received a PG-13 rating, rather than an R. According to interviews with Smith in the documentary This Film Is Not Yet Rated, it was originally given an R, due to the dialogue with Ollie and Maya discussing masturbation in the diner, but the decision was overturned. An extended cut was shown at Kevin Smith's private film festival Vulgarthon in 2005 & 2006. The extended version included much more of the Jennifer Lopez section, Ben Affleck's full speech at city hall, a longer ending, and some music changes. On the film's audio commentary, Smith stated that a longer version would be released within the next year. At a Q&A session in Vancouver in early 2009, Smith said that a release of the extended cut on DVD and Blu-ray Disc is "very possible". It has not been released as of 2020.

Reception

Box office
The film grossed $25.2 million in North America, and $10.8 million internationally, for a total gross of $36.1 million, against a $35 million budget.

Critical reception
Jersey Girl received mixed reviews from critics. The review aggregator website Rotten Tomatoes reported an approval rating of 43% based on 177 reviews, with an average rating of 5.30/10. The website's critical consensus reads, "A surprisingly conventional romantic comedy from Kevin Smith, Jersey Girl is warm but often overly sentimental". On Metacritic, the film has a score of 43 out of 100, based on 35 critics, indicating "mixed or average reviews".

Smith was quoted saying his film was "not for critics". Smith's reaction to Jersey Girl after its failure was dour. He referenced the film during his cameo appearance in Degrassi: The Next Generation, jokingly telling Paige Michalchuk, whom his character had cut out of his fictional film Jay and Silent Bob Go Canadian, Eh!, that he cut Lopez out of most of Jersey Girl and wanted to cut Affleck out too, "but then it just would have been that little kid." In an interview on the Clerks II DVD, Smith noted "All these people were just trashing this movie's stars instead of looking at the movie itself. I get that a lot of people didn't like it but dude, I spent two years of my life on that movie."

The film was nominated for three Razzie Awards: Worst Actor for Ben Affleck, Worst Supporting Actress for Jennifer Lopez, and according to the press release, "Ben Affleck and either Jennifer Lopez or Liv Tyler" for Worst On-Screen Couple. Raquel Castro won a Young Artist Award for Best Performance in a Feature Film – Young Actress Age Ten or Younger, for her performance, and the film was nominated for Best Family Feature Film – Comedy or Musical, but lost to Christmas with the Kranks.

References

External links

 
 
 
 
 

2004 films
2004 romantic comedy-drama films
American pregnancy films
American romantic comedy-drama films
2000s English-language films
Films about dysfunctional families
Films directed by Kevin Smith
Films scored by James L. Venable
Films set in 1994
Films set in 1996
Films set in 2003
Films set in New Jersey
Films set in New York City
Films shot in New Jersey
Films shot in New York City
Films shot in Toronto
Films with screenplays by Kevin Smith
Highlands, New Jersey
Miramax films
View Askew Productions films
2004 comedy films
2004 drama films
Films produced by Scott Mosier
2000s pregnancy films
2000s American films